Colonna is an Italian word for column. The name Colonna may refer to :

Places
Italy
 Colonna, Lazio, a comune in the Province of Rome
 Colonna, City of Rome, a rione in Rome
 Capo Colonna, a cape of Calabria
 Palazzo Colonna, a palatial block of buildings in central Rome
 Castel Colonna, a comune in the Province of Ancona

Monuments
Malta
 Colonna Mediterranea, a monument in Luqa

People
 Colonna (surname)
Edward Colonna, jewelry and railroad car designer, graphic artist, interior decorator, and architect
Vittoria Colonna, poetess
 Colonna family: a noble family from Rome. (Not to be confused with the Spanish Coloma family).